Crask is a small remote hamlet, situated on Farr Bay in the Scottish Highlands, on the  shore of northern Sutherland in the Scottish council area of Highland.

The village of Farr is situated immediately to the east. It is the fictional setting on the West coast of Scotland, used in John Buchan's novel 'John Macnab'.

References

Populated places in Sutherland